Vestal High School is a public high school that operates as part of the Vestal Central School District which encompasses  just west of Binghamton in the Southern Tier of New York.  It is a four-year comprehensive school which annually receives both national and state recognition for excellence in education.  The high school offers Varsity and Junior Varsity sports as well as musical opportunities in orchestra, band, and chorus.  Clubs and student organizations accommodate a wide range of interests, from the physical sciences to martial arts. The mascot of Vestal High School is the Golden Bear named Bruin. Vestal High School holds an annual dance named after the mascot called the King Bruin dance, or KB. Unlike most high schools, Vestal High School does not have a Homecoming dance, but instead a football game and later in the year the King Bruin dance.

Academics
Vestal High School is one of the only two schools in the Binghamton area to offer the International Baccalaureate (IB) program.  It has been an IB World School since January 1998.  Advanced Placement (AP) courses are also offered. In general, there are over 225 courses that are offered to students.  Vestal High School was ranked #494 on the 2007 Newsweek list of the top 1,200 high schools in the United States based on participation of students in AP and IB programs.  Many students have qualified for the National Merit Scholarship Program with a total of six finalists in 2006.  A significant number of graduates have attended Ivy League universities.
Languages taught include: French, German, Mandarin Chinese, and Spanish.

Diplomas

International Baccalaureate
The IB Program began during the 1999–2000 school year.

The program has become increasingly popular at Vestal High School with the majority of the students taking at least one AP, IB, or Honors course. In 2005, 259 students took 327 AP exams with 200 IB exams also administered.

Scholar Certificate
VHS has introduced a new honor titled The Vestal Scholar Certificate. It offers special recognition to students who successfully complete a rigorous program of study. To be eligible, a student must take and pass a minimum of six IB, AP, or Excelsior College courses. This is to replace the Honors diploma, as it is the same thing, minus several requirements.

Regents
The Regents Diploma is the standard high school diploma received by students in New York State.  It involves passing a series of Regents Examinations given by the New York State Department of Education.  There is also a Regents Diploma with Advanced Designation for students who are willing to take additional courses.

News

Vestal Facilities Project

The Vestal Central School District upgraded the deteriorating conditions of all the buildings within the district through a $54,841,000 project.  Work began in the summer of 2006 and has since been completed.

As of December 2006, both the auditorium and gymnasium were completed and open for public use. Over the 2007 summer vacation, the gymnasium floor was re-done due to improper installation.

Work was completed on the school's track and football stadium partially through the fall season. As a result, the Homecoming game was the first game played in the new stadium.

A new wing was added during the course of the 07–08 school year and was opened for students to tour during the last week of that school year. It featured many new classrooms, each with its own Smartboard and a whole-wall white board.

Renovations on the pool and its associated locker room areas began in April 2007.
Reason For The Facilities Project
All of the buildings required replacing and upgrading, especially the high school, which was built in 1960 with only minor renovations.
More classroom space was needed to meet changing academic programs and graduation requirements
The facilities were not designed to meet current security requirements.
All of the athletic fields, tracks, and playgrounds needed improvement
Auditorium space was insufficient, with only two auditoriums out of the seven buildings in the district.

Key Components of the Plan
Renovations and building improvements at all district facilities.
Additional classroom space at the high school and middle school.
Construction of a 1,200 seat auditorium at the middle school
Replacement and renovation of elementary school playgrounds.
Construction of an eight lane track and artificial turf at high school
New athletic fields at the high school and middle school
Major improvements to the football stadium at the high school

Extracurricular activities

Athletics
Vestal Boys' Soccer completed a 20-0 season by winning the State Class A Championship over Queensbury at Middletown High School on November 12, 2017. Vestal won 4-0 with Head Coach Dave Barr. On November 18, 2007, the Vestal Boys' Soccer team captured the Class AA New York State Championship.  Despite being the second-smallest AA-classification school in New York State, the Golden Bears finished the season 21-2-1.  Coach Jim Murphy was named New York State AA Soccer Coach of the Year.  It was Vestal's second solo soccer state championship since 1982 and the school's second athletic state championship of any kind since the 1997 football team, the first being a men's individual swimming title captured in March 2007.
The first Vestal Boys' Soccer team to capture a New York State title and be ranked # 1 in New York State was coached by George Herrick in Fall 1982. Vestal Won 2–1 in over time against Arlington. In 1985 the Boys' soccer team was Co-Champs with - North Babylon-11.  At the pinnacle of the school's football program, the 1975 team was ranked #6 in the nation.
Vestal Women's Volleyball is of the leading teams in the state, as well as very strong Field Hockey, Golf, and Men's Baseball teams, as of 2009.
Vestal's Men's Varsity Golf Team won the Southern Tier Athletic Conference title three years in a row from 2010 until 2012, with one College signing to St. Bonaventure. The golf team had a 16–0 record in the 2010 season, 13–2 in 2011, and 14–1 in 2012. They are one of the State's leading golf teams.

Sports Include: Football, Tennis, Golf, Cross Country, Volleyball, Field Hockey, Cheerleading, Soccer, Swimming, Bowling, Basketball, Indoor track, Wrestling, Baseball, Softball, Lacrosse, Track and Field, and club Ice Hockey.

Notable Clubs
Mathletes

The Mathletes are a competitive group of mathematicians who participate in local meets at Johnson City High School and in the New York State Mathematics League (NYSML) Contest.  Many members of Mathletes also qualify to participate in the New York State Mathletes Competition.  In 2006, Vestal High School scored the third highest in Broome County.  The Mathletes also sponsor the annual American Mathematics Competition (AMC), which is the first in the series of competitions to determine the United States Math Team who competes in the International Mathematical Olympiad (IMO).  A 2004 graduate of Vestal High School, Aaron Pixton scored a perfect score on the AMC three times from 2002-2004.  He went on to the IMO in 2003 and 2004 to win a gold medal.
Mock Trial
The Mock Trial team consists of a competitive group of students who participate in imitated trials.  The Vestal High School team was a semi-finalist in the 2005 statewide Mock Trial Tournament. The 2007 Mock Trial team won County Finals and Regionals and advanced to the state tournament in Albany. They placed 5th in the state at the competition under Thomas Bolton Walls.  The mock trial team at Vestal is currently coached by Mrs. Teal Yajko who is also a Pre-IB English teacher.
Science Olympiad
There are two competitive Science Olympiad teams at Vestal (A/B). Team A has often placed in the top five at the state competition in previous few years; The New York State Science Olympiad competition is traditionally held at West Point.  In the 2005-2006 school year, Team A placed first at the Goshen Invitational competition. At the Southern Tier Regional Competition, Team A came in first place, while Team B earned a fourth place finish. Team A competed in the New York State competition at West Point Military Academy on March 11, 2006. Vestal earned a fifth place finish for the second consecutive year.
Talent Fest
Vestal High School is locally noted for its highly regarded annual Talent Show, or "Talent Fest". The production is one of the major highlights of Vestal student life, and has had an annual attendance of over 800 over the last few years. Vestal's Talent Fest is known for the high quality of the student acts, the charisma and professional nature of the emcees, and the traditional talent fest emcee videos featured during the introduction and intermission of the program.

In 2011, Talent Fest was further highlighted by a professional video affirmation created by drummer Abe Laboriel Jr.

Other Clubs Include
Odyssey of the Mind, Science Club, Science Olympiad, Chemistry Magic Show, Peace Club, Gender and Sexuality Alliance, Environmental Club, Interact Club, Ski Club, Mock Trial, Yearbook Club, Spanish Club, German Club, French Club, SADD, National Honor Society, Student Government, Ice Hockey, Bible Club, Marching Band, School Musical, Winterguard, Art Club. There is also a German and French Exchange program.

Music

Vestal High School has a strong music program.  Many students have auditioned successfully in the New York State Schools Music Association (NYSSMA), with a few selected into All-State Festival ensembles,  and a nationwide honors orchestra at the Festival of Gold conducted by Keith Lockhart, the conductor of the Boston Pops Orchestra.  Many also participate in the Broome County Music Educators Association (BCMEA) Festival and the Binghamton Youth Symphony Orchestra (BYSO).
Band
There are several band groups in Vestal High School including a Concert Band, Freshman Band, Jazz Band, and Marching Band.  The Concert Band consists of students in grades 10-12 who participate in yearly adjudications at the NYSSMA major organizations festival and has obtained consistent high marks there.  Jazz Band is a unique group of students in grades 9-12 because nearly all the musicians in the organization are playing a second instrument.
Chorus
In addition to women's and men's choirs, Vestal High School has select vocal groups: Madrigal Choir, Jazz Choir, and Vestal Voices.  The Vestal Voices is a highly selective chorus of students in grades 10-12 who often earns high marks at NYSSMA and perform at renowned concert halls such as Carnegie Hall in New York City.  Members of the Orchestra and Vestal Voices take a trip every other year to be adjudicated at the Heritage Festival.  The top groups at the Heritage Festival are invited back for the Heritage Festival of Gold the following year to perform at an exclusive concert venue.  In the spring of 2006, the Vestal Voices attended the Heritage Festival in Virginia Beach and won the gold award. For the Heritage Festival in the spring of 2014 in Washington DC the Vestal Voices won 3rd Gold.
Orchestra
The Vestal High School Orchestra is a string group consisting of players in grades 9-12, under the direction of Marissa Crabb. This ensemble gets the least attention despite being the most successful in music competitions. The orchestra has performed at Symphony Hall in Boston.  The group consistently earns the gold with distinction award at NYSSMA and plays either level 5 or level 6 repertoire.  The orchestra also attended the Heritage Festival in Washington DC and won First Gold.

Art
The art department at Vestal High School has produced some of the best student artists in the area. In 2011, many students were named finalists and runners-up at the 2011 Arnot Art Museum ceremony, including a Gold Key Award by Dillon Utter, class of 2011.

Notable alumni
 Linda Swartz Taglialatela, US Ambassador
Laurence Leamer
Best-selling author and journalist who graduated in 1959 from Vestal Central High School.  Attended Antioch College and the Columbia University School of Journalism.  Renowned expert on the Kennedy family and author of three best-selling books about the Kennedys.

Tom Mitchell
Tom Mitchell is a 1969 graduate of Vestal High School.  Mitchell is a professor at Carnegie Mellon University, and is regarded as an expert in machine learning, artificial intelligence, and cognitive neuroscience.

Daniel Bursch
Daniel Bursch is a 1975 graduate of Vestal High School. He graduated from the United States Naval Academy with a Bachelor of Science Degree in Physics and the Naval Postgraduate School with a Master of Science Degree in engineering science.  He is a former NASA astronaut who participated in many space walks and has stayed aboard the International Space Station. He was also aboard the final NASA shuttle expedition.

Cal Harris
A star lacrosse player at Hobart College who returned to the Southern Tier after graduation to run the family's car dealerships. After his wife disappeared on the night of September 11, 2001, while the two were in finishing a bitter divorce, Harris was tried for her murder four times in ten years before ultimately being acquitted.

Peter Robinson
Peter Mark Robinson graduated from Vestal in 1975, and is an author, research fellow, television host and former speechwriter for then-Vice President George H.W. Bush and President Ronald Reagan.  He is most famous for authoring the now-famous Reagan quote "Mr. Gorbachev, tear down this wall!"

Steve Perry
Steve Perry is a 1981 graduate of Vestal High School. Lead vocalist, songwriter and founding member of multi-platinum rock/ska/swing band the Cherry Poppin' Daddies, best known for the song "Zoot Suit Riot". Perry later graduated from the University of Oregon.

Stacey Campfield
Stacey Campfield is a 1986 graduate of Vestal High School. He is a state senator in the Knoxville area in Tennessee, who has made controversial comments regarding the transmission of HIV/AIDS.

Brian L. DeMarco
Brian L. DeMarco is a 1992 graduate of Vestal High School.  Graduated with a Bachelor of Science Degree  in Physics from State University of New York at Geneseo in 1996.  DeMarco worked with Deborah S. Jin to create the first true Fermionic condensate.

References

External links

Vestal High School Website

1960 establishments in New York (state)
Educational institutions established in 1960
International Baccalaureate schools in New York (state)
Public high schools in Broome County, New York